Kirnu is a steel roller coaster located at the Linnanmäki amusement park in Helsinki, Finland. Kirnu is Intamin's first ball coaster.

Layout
The ride starts as riders climb the curved lift hill followed by a quick pre-drop and immediately go into a sharp half loop and then go through another half loop and finally another half loop before being slowed back down by near-vertical magnetic brakes, and then finally doing a quarter loop and then returning to the station.

Notability 
As Intamin's first ball coaster, it changed the way Finnish rollercoasters were viewed. The ride has since inspired new ZacSpin Roller Coasters

Incidents
On May 16, 2007, a man injured his leg on Kirnu and its brakes were renewed.

After the deadly incident on Inferno at Terra Mítica in Benidorm, Spain on July 7, 2014, and because the two rides have an identical layout, Linnanmäki had ceased running Kirnu for several days before reopening the coaster.

References

Roller coasters in Finland
Linnanmäki
Roller coasters introduced in 2007